Moffat County is a county located in the U.S. state of Colorado. As of the 2020 census, the population was 13,292. The county seat is Craig. With an area of  4,751 square miles, it is the 2nd largest county by area in Colorado, behind Las Animas County.

Moffat County comprises the Craig, CO Micropolitan Statistical Area, which is also included in the Steamboat Springs-Craig, CO Combined Statistical Area.

History

Displacement of the Native People 
The first recorded humans in northwestern Colorado were the Ute tribes. The Spanish expedition of Dominguez-Escalante of 1776 reached just south of what would be Moffat County and noted the area and inhabitants, but did not offer detailed information. In the early 1820s, William H. Ashley organized a major expedition of trappers into the Green River area of the county beginning the first use of the area's resources by Europeans.  John C. Freemont would lead the first organized exploration of Moffat County on his return from California during his second expedition. His party crossed into the future Moffat County on 6 June 1844.

Despite the encroachment by trappers, miners, and explorers, the Ute Treaty of 1868 (a.k.a. The Kit Carson Treaty) and the Brunot Treaty of 1873 identified northwestern Colorado as part of the Ute nation and 'agencies' were established to act as representatives of the U.S. government within the Ute Nation. In 1879, a new agent, Nathan Meeker, was appointed to serve at the White River Agency in northwestern Colorado. Meeker had founded a Christian-based European agricultural colony in 1870 in eastern Colorado and had strong ideas of how a community should be structured. As the 'Indian Agent' he felt compelled to change the nomadic lifestyle of the Ute Indians and attempted to 'civilize' them by converting them into farmers. His efforts to impose an agricultural lifestyle on the native people created a conflict that ultimately led to the murder of Meeker and all of the staff at the Agency. The U.S. government's reaction to the massacre resulted in the relocation of most of the Ute tribes to Utah by force. After the removal of the Ute tribes, the U.S. government opened up northwestern Colorado for mining, commercial cattle ranching, and homesteading.

Northwestern Colorado County Reorganizations of Territory/State 
In 1861, the Colorado Territory was organized and northwestern Colorado became Summit County. In 1874, Grand County was created out of the northern half of Summit County, and in 1877, Grand County was further subdivided, creating Routt County. It would be another 34 years before Moffat County would be carved out of the western portion of Routt County.  The county was named for David H. Moffat, a Colorado tycoon who died in 1911.

Development and Growth 
David Moffat had been the primary force driving the establishment of a railroad from Denver to Salt Lake City. He established the Denver, Northwestern & Pacific Railway, and attempted to build a route from Denver to Salt Lake City. Construction on the 'Moffat Road' track began in the early 1900s but it faced constant delays and challenges. It finally reached Moffat County in 1913, ending in the town of Craig. The railroad was important for cattle ranchers in Moffat County's early years; however, the track was never extended into Utah. In 1934, another more direct route was established to Salt Lake City, and Moffat County remained a branch line and never part of the main commerce rail artery between Denver and Salt Lake City.

In the 1920s, U.S. 40, a major cross-country highway, began construction. The route selected put Moffat County, and the County Seat of Craig on the 'Victory Highway' and almost exactly halfway between Denver and Salt Lake City. In 1938, the final section over the Rocky Mountains was completed and paved, with the exception of Rabbit Ears Pass in Routt County. That section would was paved before 1950. This expanded Craig's economy by adding lodging and tourism. Unfortunately, Moffat County was excluded from the initial Interstate Highway System plans as I-80 was routed through southern Wyoming and I-70 was planned to end in Denver and not cross the Rocky Mountains. Then Colorado Governor and former Moffat County resident, Edwin C. Johnson lobbied for I-70 to continue through Denver and connect to Salt Lake City. Eventually, the federal highway agency approved I-70 to continue through Colorado but routed it through Grand Junction, Colorado, and leaving Moffat County as a secondary highway isolated between the two main east/west Interstate arteries.  

The population in Moffat County stabilized at just over 5,000 people by the first census in 1920; however, remained stagnant until the 1970s when construction of three coal-fired electrical power plants began. Those three plants are now scheduled to be closed in 2025, 2028, and 2030, respectively creating a severe impact on the County's economy.  Beyond the energy industries, Moffat County's ranching, agricultural, and tourism industries round out its primary economy. The 2020 census data has the population at almost the same as the post-power plant boom in the 1980s at 13,292 people. The 2021 estimated about 100 fewer people in the county. 

It is the second-largest county by area in Colorado.

Adjacent counties
 Routt County – east
 Rio Blanco County – south
 Uintah County, Utah – west
 Daggett County, Utah – west
 Sweetwater County, Wyoming – north
 Carbon County, Wyoming – north

Major highways
  U.S. Highway 40
  State Highway 13
  State Highway 317
  State Highway 318
  State Highway 394
  Wyoming Highway 70

National protected areas
Browns Park National Wildlife Refuge
Dinosaur National Monument
Routt National Forest
White River National Forest
Yampa River State Park

Scenic byway
Dinosaur Diamond Prehistoric Highway National Scenic Byway

Summit
 Cold Spring Mountain

Demographics

As of the census of 2000, there were 13,184 people, 4,983 households, and 3,577 families residing in the county.  The population density was 3 people per square mile (1/km2).  There were 5,635 housing units at an average density of 1 per square mile (0/km2).  The racial makeup of the county was 93.61% White, 0.21% Black or African American, 0.88% Native American, 0.33% Asian, 0.02% Pacific Islander, 3.17% from other races, and 1.77% from two or more races.  9.46% of the population were Hispanic or Latino of any race.

There were 4,983 households, out of which 38.20% had children under the age of 18 living with them, 58.70% were married couples living together, 8.20% had a female householder with no husband present, and 28.20% were non-families. 23.60% of all households were made up of individuals, and 8.10% had someone living alone who was 65 years of age or older.  The average household size was 2.58 and the average family size was 3.05.

In the county, the population was spread out, with 28.50% under the age of 18, 8.60% from 18 to 24, 29.90% from 25 to 44, 23.80% from 45 to 64, and 9.40% who were 65 years of age or older.  The median age was 35 years. For every 100 females, there were 107.70 males.  For every 100 females age 18 and over, there were 106.20 males.

The median income for a household in the county was $41,528, and the median income for a family was $45,511. Males had a median income of $37,288 versus $22,080 for females. The per capita income for the county was $18,540.  About 6.90% of families and 8.30% of the population were below the poverty line, including 8.30% of those under age 18 and 9.30% of those age 65 or over.

Communities

City
Craig

Town
Dinosaur

Census-designated place
Maybell

Other unincorporated places
Blue Mountain
Elk Springs
Greystone
Hamilton
Lay
Loyd
Massadona
Slater
Sunbeam

Politics
Moffat is a Republican county in Presidential elections. No Democratic presidential candidate has carried Moffat County since Lyndon Johnson's 1964 landslide, and indeed no Democrat post-1964 has obtained even forty percent of the county's vote. Moffat was one of fifteen counties (two in Colorado) to give a plurality to Ross Perot in the 1992 election, but every other Republican candidate since 1968 has obtained an absolute majority in Moffat County.

In gubernatorial elections, Moffat County has also generally been Republican, but was nonetheless carried by Democrat Roy Romer by a narrow margin in 1990 – when he carried all but four counties statewide – by Dick Lamm in 1982 and by Constitution Party candidate Tom Tancredo in 2010. In senatorial elections, the Republican candidate has consistently garnered over sixty percent of Moffat County voters since future party-switcher Ben Nighthorse Campbell won the county for the Democratic Party in 1992.

See also

 Outline of Colorado
 Index of Colorado-related articles
 National Register of Historic Places listings in Moffat County, Colorado

References

External links

 
 Dinosaur National Monument
 Colorado County Evolution, by Don Stanwyck
 Colorado Historical Society

 
Colorado counties
1911 establishments in Colorado
Populated places established in 1911